Joseph Brasbridge (1743–28 February 1832), was a silversmith and autobiographer.

Life
Brasbridge began business as a silversmith, with a good capital, in Fleet Street, London. Pleasure continually seduced him from his shop, and bankruptcy followed as a matter of course; but eventually he was re-established in business through the kindness of friends. In his eightieth year, hoping that his own indiscretions might prove a warning to others, he had published, at his own expense, his memoirs under the title of The Fruits of Experience. His book went through two printings in 1824. It has not been reprinted since. His portrait is prefixed. He died at Highgate on 28 February 1832.

References

1743 births
1832 deaths
English silversmiths